Euryparasitidae is a family of mites in the order Mesostigmata.

Genera and species
Acugamasus D. C. Lee, 1970
Acugamasus plumitergus Karg, 1997
Acugamasus punctatus (Womersley, 1942)
Acugamasus tuberculatus Karg, 1993
Allogamasellus Athias-Henriot, 1961
Allogamasellus aquafortensis Athias-Henriot, 1961
Cyrtolaelaps Berlese, 1887
Cyrtolaelaps aster (Berlese, 1918)
Cyrtolaelaps berlessei Chelebiev, 1984
Cyrtolaelaps mucronatus (G. Canestrini & R. Canestrini, 1881)
Cyrtolaelaps paraster Costa, 1961
Cyrtolaelaps qinghaiensis Ma, 1988
Cyrtolaelaps subnudus (Berlese, 1918)
Euryparasitus Oudemans, 1901
Euryparasitus calcarator (Banks, 1910)
Euryparasitus changanensis Gu & Huang, 1992
Euryparasitus citelli Bai, Chen & Gu, 1988
Euryparasitus davydovae Bondarchuk & Buyakova, 1978
Euryparasitus emarginatus (C. L. Koch, 1839)
Euryparasitus kasakstanicus Chelebiev, 1978
Euryparasitus laxiventralis Gu & Guo, 1995
Euryparasitus longicheta Bondarchuk & Buyakova, 1978
Euryparasitus pagumae Ishikawa, 1988
Euryparasitus taojiangensis Ma, 1982
Heterogamasus Trägårdh, 1907
Heterogamasus calcarellus
Notogamasellus Loots & Ryke, 1966
Notogamasellus vandenbergi Loots & Ryke, 1966
Notogamasellus magoebaensis Loots & Ryke, 1966
Starkovia Lombardini, 1947
Starkovia termitophila Lombardini, 1947

References

Mesostigmata
Acari families